Bratovoești is a commune in Dolj County, Oltenia, Romania with a population of  3,693  people. It is composed of four villages: Bădoși, Bratovoești, Georocu Mare and Prunet. It also included Rojiște and Tâmburești villages until 2004, when they were split off to form Rojiște Commune.

References

Communes in Dolj County
Localities in Oltenia